Wang Ruidong (born 8 July 2000) is a Chinese cyclist, who currently rides for UCI Continental team . He is expected to compete in the road race at the 2020 Summer Olympics.

Major results
2020
 National Road Championships
2nd Road race
4th Time trial

References

External links

2000 births
Living people
Chinese male cyclists
Olympic cyclists of China
Cyclists at the 2020 Summer Olympics
21st-century Chinese people